Patrick Hepburn may refer to:

 Patrick Hepburn (bishop) (died 1573), notorious Scottish prelate, bishop of Moray and Commendator of Scone
 Patrick Hepburn, 1st Lord Hailes (died 1483), Scottish baron and parliamentary peer
 Patrick Hepburn, 1st Earl of Bothwell (died 1508), Scottish noble
 Patrick Hepburn, 3rd Earl of Bothwell (died 1556), Scottish noble
 Patrick Hepburn of Waughton, Scottish laird